Vinger may refer to:

Places
Vinger, a traditional district in Innlandet county, Norway
Vinger Municipality, a former municipality in the old Hedmark county, Norway
Kongsvinger (town), sometimes locally called Vinger, a town in Innlandet county, Norway
Vinger Royal Road, a historic road in Vinger, Norway
Vinger Church, a church in Kongsvinger municipality in Innlandet county, Norway

Other
Singer Vinger, an Estonian punk rock band